Ngonga is an administrative ward in the Kyela district of the Mbeya Region of Tanzania. The village is on Lake Nyasa by the Songwe River that forms the Tanzania and Malawi border, and thirty minute drive from the border crossing in Kasumulu.

In 2016 reports there were 9,159 people in the ward, from 8,310 in 2012, and 7,572 in 2002. The ward has .

Villages / vitongoji 
The ward has 5 villages and 26 vitongoji.

 Itenya
 Ijumbe
 Isuba
 Itenya
 Mbangala
 Mpulo
 Itete
 Isanga
 Lusanga
 Mota
 Mpanda
 Lugombo
 Butangali
 Kyimbila
 Lugombo
 Masumba
 Mpata
 Ndola
 Ngonga
 Iringa
 Kiputa
 Magege
 Masoko
 Mbande
 Mbyasyo
 Mota
 Njisi
 Nsasa
 Bujesi
 Ndyali
 Nsasa

References 

Wards of Mbeya Region